James Pearson Blacklock (17 February 1883 – 22 January 1935) was a New Zealand cricketer who played first-class cricket for Wellington from 1904 to 1914. He also played two matches for New Zealand in the years before New Zealand played Test cricket.

Blacklock was born in Wellington, New Zealand, and died in Westport, West Coast, New Zealand. He
appeared in twenty first-class matches as a right-handed batsman. He scored 864 runs, with one century: 124 against Hawke's Bay in 1908–09.

Blacklock's father, James Blacklock, played for Wellington from 1878 to 1883.

He fought in the Boer War at the age of 17. He later worked as an accountant and secretary in the tanning firm of Hirst and Co. of Wellington.

References

External links
 
 

1883 births
1935 deaths
New Zealand military personnel of the Second Boer War
New Zealand cricketers
Pre-1930 New Zealand representative cricketers
Wellington cricketers
New Zealand people of Australian descent